The 2018 Grand Prix de Denain was the 60th edition of the Grand Prix de Denain cycle race and was held on 18 March 2018. The race started and finished in Denain. The race was won by Kenny Dehaes.

General classification

References

2018
2018 in French sport
2018 UCI Europe Tour